John or Jon Stock may refer to:

John Stock (teacher) (1764–1842)
Jon Stock (born 1966), British writer
John Stock (American football) (born 1933), see List of Pittsburgh Steelers players
John Stock (bishop) (1918–1972), Ukrainian Catholic bishop in the United States

See also

John Stocks (disambiguation)